Vasil Konstantinov (born 15 March 1929) is a Bulgarian gymnast. He competed in eight events at the 1952 Summer Olympics.

References

1929 births
Living people
Bulgarian male artistic gymnasts
Olympic gymnasts of Bulgaria
Gymnasts at the 1952 Summer Olympics
Place of birth missing (living people)